Sarah Jayne Bell  is a Professor of Environmental Engineering based at The Bartlett School in University College London (UCL). She works on urban water systems and is Director of the UCL Engineering Exchange.

Early life and education 
Bell studied chemistry and environmental engineering at the University of Western Australia and graduated with a Bachelor's of Science and Bachelor's of Engineering in 1996. She moved to the University of New England in Australia for her graduate studies and earned her master's degree in environmental management in 1999. Bell was a doctoral student at Murdoch University, where she worked on sustainability and technology policy and completed her PhD in 2004. In 2005 Bell joined University College London.

Research and career 
After moving to the United Kingdom, Bell was awarded an Engineering and Physical Sciences Research Council Research Fellowship on Living With Environmental Change. Her research considers urban water systems and infrastructure provision, and involves collaboration between engineers and their local communities. Bell has studied the ability of health systems to respond to climate change. She has worked with AECOM, Thames Water and Arup Group. She was promoted to Professor in September 2018.

Bell identified that there was not much collaboration between engineers, architects and local communities. In an effort to mitigate this lack of communication, Bell founded the University College London Engineering Exchange. She worked with UCL Urban Laboratory to launch a review into social housing, which identified that demolition decisions are often made by professional bodies without adequate engagement with residents. She is part of the Community Water Management for a Liveable London (CAMELLIA), which looks to improve decision making through community and industry engagement. As part of CAMELLIA Bell has looked to make London's water supply more sustainable.

Bell is committed to teaching and her efforts have been recognised by the Royal Academy of Engineering and University College London. She is a Fellow of the Chartered Institution of Water and Environmental Management and Institution of Civil Engineers.

Selected publications

References 

Living people
Year of birth missing (living people)
British women engineers
Academics of University College London
University of Western Australia alumni
University of New England (Australia) alumni
Murdoch University alumni
Fellows of the Institution of Civil Engineers
Environmental engineers